The Tamaulipan montane garter snake (Thamnophis mendax) is a species of snake of the family Colubridae. It is endemic to the Sierra Madre Oriental of Tamaulipas, Mexico, where it has been found between 1,100 and 1,600 meters elevation.

References 

Thamnophis
Snakes of North America
Endemic reptiles of Mexico
Fauna of the Sierra Madre Oriental
Reptiles described in 1955